A. Venkatesh (birth name Venkatesh Anguraj) is an Indian film cinematographer, known for his works in Kannada, Tamil and Telugu films. 
He is known for his frequent collaborations with filmmakers like Saran, A. Venkatesh, Suraj, Rishab Shetty, and Santhosh Ananddram.

Career
Venkatesh graduated from Film and Television Institute of India (FTII). He started his career by assisting cinematographer R. Raghunatha Reddy, in Duet, who was then a regular for K. Balachander.

Filmography

References

External source

Tamil film cinematographers
Living people
Year of birth missing (living people)
Kannada film cinematographers
Telugu film cinematographers